Acleris gibbopterana is a species of moth of the family Tortricidae. It is found in China (Sichuan).

The wingspan is about 18.4 mm. The forewings are ochreous brown, but the median area of the cell is pale ochreous and the area of the cubital vein is yellowish white. The hindwings are brown. Adults have been recorded on wing in August.

References

Moths described in 1993
gibbopterana
Moths of Asia